Carlos Martin Briceno (born August 10, 1967) is an American volleyball player who competed in the 1992 Summer Olympics.

He was born in Newport Beach, California and played college ball at University of Hawaii.

In 1992 he was part of the American team which won the bronze medal in the Olympic tournament. He played four matches.

References
 

1967 births
Living people
American men's volleyball players
Volleyball players at the 1992 Summer Olympics
Olympic bronze medalists for the United States in volleyball
Hawaii Rainbow Warriors volleyball players
Medalists at the 1992 Summer Olympics
20th-century American people
21st-century American people